Ryan Harrison and Travis Rettenmaier were the defending champions but Harrison decided not to participate.
Rettenmaier played alongside Amer Delić and successfully defended his title defeating Nicholas Monroe and Jack Sock in the final 6–4, 7–6(7–3).

Seeds

Draw

Draw

References
 Main Draw

Honolulu Challenger - Doubles
2012 Doubles